Journey to the South Pacific is a 2013 IMAX documentary film directed by Greg MacGillivray. It was narrated by Cate Blanchett.

The film contains a strong message of marine conservation in the unique ecosystems of the Coral Triangle of Indonesia, while showcasing the island life of the native population.

References

External links
 
 

2013 films
IMAX short films
IMAX documentary films
MacGillivray Freeman Films films
2010s English-language films